Sujata Patel is an Indian sociologist, currently holding the position of National Fellow at the Indian Institute of Advanced Study.

Bibliography

Authored and edited books
 The ISA Handbook of Diverse Sociological Traditions (London: Sage, 2010)
 Urban Studies. Readers in Sociology and Social Anthropology (Co-editor) (Delhi: OUP, 2006)
 Bombay and Mumbai. The City in Transition (Co-edited with Jim Masselos) (Delhi: OUP, 2003)
 Thinking Social Science in India. Essays in Honour of Alice Thorner. (Co-editor with Jashodhara Bagchi and Krishna Raj)(New Delhi: Sage, 2002)
 Bombay  Metaphor for Modern India (Co-editor with Alice Thorner) (Bombay and Delhi: Oxford University Press, 1995/96/2000)
 Bombay Mosaic of Modern Culture (Co-editor with Alice Thorner) (Bombay and Delhi: Oxford University Press, 1995/96/2000)
 Making of Industrial Relations. Ahmedabad Textile Industry 1918–1939 (Delhi: Oxford University Press, 1986)

Selected journal articles and book chapters
 'Sociology’s ‘Other’. The Debate on European Universals in The Encyclopaedia of Life Support Systems (Social Sciences and Humanities),UNESCO, 2010.www.eolss.net
 Seva, sangathanas and gurus: service and the making of the Hindu nation in Gurpreet Mahajan and Surinder Jodhka (ed.s) Religion, Community and Development, Delhi, Routledge2010
 Introduction. Diversities of Sociological Traditions in Sujata Patel, (ed) The ISA Handbook of Diverse Sociological Traditions, Sage  London, 2010
 At crossroads. Sociology in India in Sujata Patel, (ed) The ISA Handbook of Diverse Sociological Traditions, Sage, London, 2010
 In Conversation with Professor Sujata Patel, Interview with Pooja Adhikary, ISA E Bulletin, Number 14, November 2009
 Doing Urban Studies in India. The Challenges. Special issue on Indian Sociology, South African Review of Sociology, 40 (1) 2009
 The Ethnography of the Labouring Poor in India Introduction, The Jan Breman Omnibus, Delhi, Oxford University Press, 2007
 Towards a praxiological understanding of Indian Society The Sociology of A.R. Desai in Satish Deshpande, Nandini Sundar and Patricia Uberoi (ed.s) Anthropology of the East: The Indian Foundations of a Global Discipline, New Delhi, Permanent Black, 2007
 Sociological Study of Religion, Colonial Modernity, and Nineteenth Century Majoritarianism. Economic and Political Weekly, 42 (13), 1089–1094. 2007
 Mumbai. The Mega-City of a Poor Country in Klaus Segbers (ed) The Making of Global City Regions: Johannesburg, Mumbai/Bombay, Sao Paulo, and Shanghai, Baltimore, Johns Hopkins Press, 2007
 Empowerment, Co-option, and Domination: The Politics of Employment Guarantee Scheme of Maharashtra in Economic and Political Weekly,  41 (50) 5126–5133, 2006
 Urban Studies: An Exploration in Theory and Practices in  Sujata Patel and Kushal Deb (ed.s) Urban Studies, Reader in Sociology and Social Anthropology (Series Editor TN Madan) Delhi, Oxford University Press, 2006
 Beyond Binaries. Towards Self Reflexive Sociologies, Current Sociology, 54 (3), 381–395, 2006
 Challenges to Sociological Practices in India Today, International Sociological Association E Bulletin,Spring March 2006
 Regional Politics, City Conflicts and Communal Riots:''  Ahmedabad 1985–86 in Rajendra Vora and Anne Feldhouse (eds) Region and Regionalism, New Delhi Manohar, 353–376, 2006

References
 https://uohyd.academia.edu/SujataPatel
 http://uohyd.ernet.in/academic//school_study/social.../Sujata_Patel.pdf
 http://www.uohyd.ernet.in/academic//school_study/social_sciences/faculty_sociology.html
 Sujata’s papers are available here

Living people
Indian women sociologists
Indian sociologists
Elphinstone College alumni
University of Mumbai alumni
Dalhousie University alumni
Jawaharlal Nehru University alumni
Academic staff of Savitribai Phule Pune University
Scientists from Hyderabad, India
20th-century Indian women scientists
20th-century Indian social scientists
Year of birth missing (living people)